Rockwood is a city in southeastern Wayne County in the U.S. state of Michigan. The population was 3,289 at the 2010 census.

Geography

Demographics

2010 census
As of the census of 2010, there were 3,289 people, 1,295 households, and 900 families living in the city. The racial makeup of the city was 94.6% White, 1.7% African American, 0.9% Native American, 0.9% Asian, 0.4% from other races, and 1.5% from two or more races. Hispanic or Latino of any race were 2.7% of the population.

There were 1,295 households, of which 32.1% had children under the age of 18 living with them, 52.0% were married couples living together, 12.4% had a female householder with no husband present, 5.1% had a male householder with no wife present, and 30.5% were non-families. 25.9% of all households were made up of individuals, and 8.6% had someone living alone who was 65 years of age or older. The average household size was 2.52 and the average family size was 3.04.

The median age in the city was 40.9 years. 23% of residents were under the age of 18; 8.4% were between the ages of 18 and 24; 24.7% were from 25 to 44; 31.8% were from 45 to 64; and 12% were 65 years of age or older. The gender makeup of the city was 50.1% male and 49.9% female.

2000 census
As of the census of 2000, there were 3,442 people, 1,318 households, and 929 families living in the city. The racial makeup of the city was 95.64% White, 0.64% African American, 0.99% Native American, 0.61% Asian, 0.96% from other races, and 1.16% from two or more races. Hispanic or Latino of any race were 2.53% of the population.

There were 1,318 households, out of which 33.4% had children under the age of 18 living with them, 55.8% were married couples living together, 10.2% had a female householder with no husband present, and 29.5% were non-families. 24.2% of all households were made up of individuals, and 8.2% had someone living alone who was 65 years of age or older.  The average household size was 2.60 and the average family size was 3.10.

In the city, the population was spread out, with 24.7% under the age of 18, 9.6% from 18 to 24, 30.1% from 25 to 44, 26.2% from 45 to 64, and 9.4% who were 65 years of age or older.  The median age was 36 years. For every 100 females, there were 103.4 males.  For every 100 females age 18 and over, there were 101.2 males.

The median income for a household in the city was $55,987, and the median income for a family was $59,677. Males had a median income of $51,977 versus $30,684 for females. The per capita income for the city was $23,563.  About 2.3% of families and 4.0% of the population were below the poverty line, including 3.7% of those under age 18 and none of those age 65 or over.

Government
Rockwood uses a city council consisting of seven council members including the mayor. As of March 2020, the current mayor is Daniel G. Guzzi.

Education
Rockwood is in the Gibraltar School District.

References

External links

Cities in Wayne County, Michigan
Metro Detroit
1861 establishments in Michigan
Populated places established in 1861